Federal Route 171, or Jalan Serdang–Selama (formerly Kedah state route K7), is a federal road in Kedah, Malaysia.

Features
At most sections, the Federal Route 171 was built under the JKR R5 road standard, allowing maximum speed limit of up to 90 km/h.

List of junctions

References

171